Djibouti (also called Djibouti City and in many early English texts and on many early maps, Jibuti;  , ,) is the eponymous capital of Djibouti, and has more people than the rest of Djibouti combined. It is located in the coastal Djibouti Region on the Gulf of Tadjoura.

Djibouti has a population of around 600,000 inhabitants, which counts for 54% of the country's population. The settlement was founded in 1888 by the French, on land leased from the ruling Somali and Afar Sultans. During the ensuing period, it served as the capital of French Somaliland and its successor the French Territory of the Afars and Issas.

Known as the Pearl of the Gulf of Tadjoura due to its location, Djibouti is strategically positioned near the world's busiest shipping lanes and acts as a refueling and transshipment center. The Port of Djibouti is the principal maritime port for imports to and exports from neighboring Ethiopia. Djibouti-Ambouli International Airport is the main domestic airport, connecting the capital to various major global destinations. Djibouti has the second-largest economy of any city in the Horn of Africa after Addis Ababa.

History

There is evidence of human settlement on the eastern coastline of Djibouti dating back to the Bronze Age.

From 1862 until 1894, the land to the north of the Gulf of Tadjoura was called Obock and was ruled by Issa and Afar Sultans, local authorities with whom France signed various treaties between 1883 and 1887 to first gain a foothold in the region. The exchange of Franco-British diplomatic notes of 2 and 9 February 1888 fixed the territorial limit between the colonies of the two countries; leaving explicitly under French authority the southern coasts of the Gulf of Tadjoura, including a peninsula composed of insubmersible plateaux, Ras Djibouti as a highly strategic location, a future bridgehead for French designs in the rest of Africa and Asia. It is then that this point begins to be used as departure for caravans towards Harar. 

The French subsequently founded Djibouti in 1888, in a previously uninhabited stretch of coast. According to one account, this was due to "its superiority to Obok both in respect to harbour accommodation and in nearness to Harrar." Canbala appears in Muhammad al-Idrisi's map of 1192 on the coast of the Horn of Africa, southeast of the straits of Bab-el-Mandeb, and with Cambaleh, a town where the Venetian traveler Bragadino, a thirteenth-century European visitor to Ethiopia, resided for eight years. In 1896, the settlement was made the capital of French Somaliland.
The main purpose of the French interest in colonizing the region was to protect their trade routes to Madagascar and Indochina from the encroachment of other European powers. The town later grew considerably in size following the construction of the Franco-Ethiopian Railway. In 1895, Djibouti, which, not so long ago, was just a peninsula, already had 5,000 inhabitants. Many Issa and Afar nomads left their herds to settle here, built houses on what is now the downtown area. They became dockers and constitute the first local proletariat. The French and natives built hotels, houses, mosques and churches. The Yemeni, Egyptian, Greek, Armenian and Italian merchants and traders flock to this promise that Djibouti represents. Additionally, the rich agricultural southern area of Ambouli continued to flourish due to an abundance of date palm farms and Orchards. Djibouti did not attract as many boats as Aden. In 1896, Léonce Lagarde became the first governor of the French Somali Coast, a new name for the French dependencies in the region. At the start of the 20th century, Djibouti had 10,000 inhabitants and was considered a major regional port. Its main activity remains the supply of French ships en route to Indochina or Madagascar. Only 150,000 tonnes of freight per year are handled. In addition, the railway line has not yet been fully exploited.

Although the initial French efforts to establish commercial influence in the region proved to be unsuccessful enough to require a government bailout, the Franco-Ethiopian Railway itself was a success and allowed Djibouti's commerce to quickly eclipse the former caravan-based trade carried on with nearby Zeila in British Somaliland. Djibouti became the center of exports from southern Ethiopia and the Ogaden, including trade in Harari coffee and khat. Djibouti began to develop as a commercial center. In 1933, Djibouti was the first town to be wired to electricity in French Somaliland. On 12 July 1926, the Fontainebleau, a Messageries Maritimes steamer loaded with cotton and heading for China caught fire while approaching Djibouti. The captain decided to flood the holds and run aground his ship in the middle of the harbor of Djibouti, causing significant inconvenience for port traffic. The city then proposed using the wreck as a promontory of a new deep-water port, connecting it to the Marabout plateau by a 700-meter jetty. The idea was accepted and work began in 1931. The first phase was completed in 1935 and considerably increased port and rail traffic. An oil terminal was built in 1937.

During the Second World War, Djibouti was hit by Italian airstrikes on 21 June 1940, which killed many people in the town. The anti-aircraft fire was intense and two Italian aircraft failed to return, but fires and explosions were seen in Djibouti. Overnight, several waves of Savoia-Marchetti SM.81 bombers attacked the port facilities. After the France fell and the colony was then ruled by the pro-Axis Vichy (French) government. By that time, the Allied offensive against the Italians included a blockade of French Somaliland. On 25 September the RAF launched several airstrikes on the city, prompting French official Nouailhetas to institute a brutal reign of terror against Europeans and African inhabitants of the city. Famine set in malnutrition-related diseases took many lives, 70% of them women and children and many townsfolk left for the hinterland. The locals named the blockade the carmii, a word for a type of sorghum usually reserved for cattle, but used as human food at the height of the famine. The head doctor at the hospital committed suicide in despair. Only a few Arab dhows (boutres) managed to run the blockade to Djibouti and Obock and only two French ships from Madagascar managed to run it. 
The Japanese declaration of war (7 December 1941) gave the colony some respite, since the Royal Navy were forced to withdraw all but two ships from the blockade for use in the Far East. The rule of Nouailhetas was too brutal for even the authoritarian leaders at Vichy to stand for. In October 1942 he was recalled and forced to retire without a pension, Following the war, he escaped to Portugal. He returned to face a military tribunal and was acquitted on 17 July 1953, which sparked outrage in Djibouti. The Commander-in-Chief, East Africa, William Platt, codenamed the negotiations for the surrender of French Somaliland "Pentagon", because there were five sides: himself, the Vichy governor, the Free French, the British minister at Addis Ababa and the United States. Christian Raimond Dupont surrendered and Colonel Raynal's troops crossed back into French Somaliland on 26 December 1942, completing its liberation. The official handover took place at 10:00 p.m. on 28 December. The first governor appointed under the Free French was André Bayardelle.

In 1946, Djibouti received the status of overseas territory. An elected territorial assembly was created then, in 1956, a government council charged, under the chairmanship of the head of the territory, with the management of local affairs. At the same time, fiscal, customs and monetary measures are put in place to promote the development of the deep-water port, to finally compete with Aden. Port facilities are expanding considerably and can afford to accommodate 2,000 ships per year. Djibouti becomes a free port and abandons the free zone. In 1948, a new currency, the Côte Française des Somalis, was created, pegged to the gold standard and convertible into dollars.

In August 1966, an official visit to the territory by then French President, General Charles de Gaulle, was also met with demonstrations and rioting. In response to the protests, de Gaulle ordered another referendum. On 19 March 1967, a second plebiscite was held to determine the fate of the territory. Initial results supported a continued but looser relationship with France. However, the referendum was again marred by reports of vote rigging on the part of the French authorities, voters rejected independence by a 50-point margin. Announcement of the plebiscite results sparked civil unrest, including several deaths.

The population of Djibouti was growing rapidly, from officially about 17,000 inhabitants in 1947. In 1949, the plan of Djibouti consisted of four main features: a hierarchical system of streets laid out in a grid, large blocks consisting of small-scale domestic dwellings, the organization of these blocks around central open spaces, and the concentration of cultural institutions to form a civic center. It then became the headquarters of the succeeding French Territory of the Afars and Issas.

When Djibouti declared Independence on 27 June 1977, the population of Djibouti was over 110,000, the city has served as the administrative and commercial capital of the Republic of Djibouti.

Geography

Topography
Djibouti is the capital and largest settlement in Djibouti, situated in the Horn of Africa. It is a seaport with the only sheltered harbour on the western side of the Gulf of Tadjoura. The wadi of Ambouli, flows through the city, separating the older parts of the city from the Balbala district. The landscape around the city, along with Djibouti's coastal lowlands, is either desert or semi-desert. The city's sandy beaches include Siesta Beach and Heron Beach.

Vegetation
Djibouti is rich in plant species partly because of its diversity of habitats, including beaches, mangroves and semi-arid lands. The most prevalent plant communities are the African foxtail grass, Urochondra, Panicum turgidum and Acacia tortilis.

Geology
Djibouti is subject to earthquakes because of its location on the Somali Plate and Red Sea Rift. The geological instability has produced numerous faults, which cause earthquakes but most of them are too small to be felt.

Districts

Djibouti's urban area is partitioned into 31 districts, which include Heron, Gabode, Haramous and Makka Al Moukarama. Balbala suburb has been officially part of the city since 1987, and is divided into 18 districts. The commune of Ras-Dika whose territory corresponds to the 6th arrondissement. The commune of Boulaos regroups the 1st, 2nd and 3rd arrondissements. The town of Balbala includes the 4th and 5th arrondissements. The sandy beaches of Djibouti city have vibrant coral reefs, and are prime real estate for the first tourist resorts in many years.

Climate
Djibouti has an arid climate (Köppen: BWh). It is characterised by very hot rainless summers and a very warm, slightly wetter winter season. Most of the annual precipitation falls between October and May. The city sees on average  of rainfall per year. There are two seasons: a hot dry season from May to October and a cooler season with more precipitation from November to April (winter). The rainfall on the coast usually occurs between November to March, whereas further inland it falls between April to October. In the summer months, temperatures routinely exceed , with relative humidity at its lowest point of the year. Sunshine is abundant in the city, averaging eight to ten hours a day year-round. It is lowest during the rainy period, when there is some coastal fog and greater cloud coverage as warm air passes over the cool sea surface. However, precipitation is highly variable and long periods without any rainfall occur throughout the year. Unusual episodes of heavy rain sometimes occur, with a maximal  falling in November 1949.

There are barely any days in the year without sunshine, and even during the winter there are many clear days.

Demographics

Djibouti is a multi-ethnic town. It has a population of around 603,900 residents (Djiboutians) in 2018, making it by far the largest settlement in the country. The largest ethnic group are the Somali and the second largest being Afars, both Cushitic speaking Cushitic peoples. The city's urban landscape is shaped by many communities. The ethnic make-up of Djibouti changed in 1990s, when significant numbers of Ethiopians and Somali immigrants arrived in the city, with Djibouti nicknamed the "French Hong Kong in the Red Sea" due to its cosmopolitan urbanism.

The majority of local residents speak Somali (303,100 speakers) or Afar (101,200 speakers) as a first language, which are the mother tongues of the Somali and Afar ethnic groups, respectively. Both languages belong to the larger Afroasiatic family. There are two official languages in Djibouti: Arabic (Afroasiatic) and French (Indo-European).

Arabic is of social, cultural and religious importance. In formal settings, it consists of Modern Standard Arabic. Colloquially, about 40,000 local residents speak the Ta'izzi-Adeni Arabic dialect, also known as Southern Yemeni Arabic due to Yemeni immigrants. French was inherited from the colonial period and is the primary language of instruction. About 14,200 Djiboutians speak it as a first language. Immigrant languages include Omani Arabic (38,900 speakers) and Amharic (1,400 speakers).

Djibouti's population is predominantly Muslim. Islam is observed by 94% of the nation's population (around 740,000 ), whereas the remaining 6% of residents are Christian adherents. The Diocese of Djibouti serves the small local Catholic population, which it estimates numbered around 7,000 individuals in 2006.

Religion
Among the places of worship, they are predominantly Muslim mosques. There are also Christian churches and temples : Ethiopian Orthodox Tewahedo Church, Roman Catholic Diocese of Djibouti (Catholic Church), Protestant churches, Evangelical Churches.

Cityscape

Architecture
Djibouti is home to different architectural styles that represent various periods in its history. The old section is filled with bazaars and souks nestled along narrow streets. Djibouti has wide streets, restaurants, Plaza (town squares) and cafes while many of the boulevards are lined with trees. It is serves as both a center for commerce and entertainment, as well as a residential area. To accommodate the growing middle class, many new apartments and housing developments are being constructed in and around the city. A few of the building fronts have been renovated and date back to the 19th century. The Place of 27 June in the city center is also distinguished by its Moorish-inspired arches. Due to its numerous exotic edifices and structures, the city has also been likened to a European settlement.

Administration

Djibouti has the distinction of being both a city and an administrative province. The Djibouti Region is one of the six regions of Djibouti. It borders the Gulf of Tadjoura and Gulf of Aden to the north and east, and the Arta Region to the south and west. The Djibouti Region is the smallest province in the country, but contains the national capital, Djibouti, and thus is the region with the greatest population of people.

Local government
The administration of Djibouti City is formed of three municipalities: The commune of Ras-Dika, commune of Boulaos and commune of Balbala. The Djibouti City Council elected members headed by the mayor, who serves a five-year term and appoints deputies. The mayor of Djibouti City, who has executive powers, and the National Assembly, which scrutinises the mayor's decisions and can accept or reject the mayor's budget proposals each year. They are responsible for most local services, such as local planning, schools, social services, local roads and refuse collection. Certain functions, such as waste management, are provided through joint arrangements.

National government
Djibouti City is the seat of the Government of Djibouti. Many government departments, as well as the President's residence at the presidential palace are based. The National Assembly (formerly the Chamber of Deputies) is the country's legislature consisting of 65 members elected every five years. Although unicameral, the Constitution provides for the creation of a senate. The Social Development Agency of Djibouti (Agence de Développement Sociale de Djibouti) has its head offices here, as does the Intergovernmental Authority on Development (IGAD) trade bloc. Additionally, the Regional Somali Language Academy, a language regulator established in June 2013 by the governments of Djibouti, Somalia and Ethiopia, has its headquarters in the city.

Policing and crime
Policing in Djibouti City is provided by the National Police, who patrol the city. It is also responsible for providing emergency services, including the Djibouti Fire Brigade. The police are supported by the National Gendarmerie, a branch of the Djiboutian Armed Forces, though their police operations now are supervised by the Ministry of the Interior. Djibouti City is also home to the Armoured Regiment of Djibouti. The French 5th Overseas Interarms Regiment has served as the Djibouti garrison since 1 November 1969.

Culture

The National Archives & National Library of Djibouti is the main museum in the city. For much of its recent history, the town was characterized by roadside markets and small shops that sold a wide variety of goods. The culture of Djibouti has evolved under the influence of many different peoples, cultures and civilizations throughout history, including Somali, Afar, Yemeni and French traditions. The capital city is home to a large number of mosques incorporating various architectural styles, which date from different historical periods. Five times a day, Muslims are called to prayer from the minarets of the city's many mosques. Additionally, the local opera is a traditional form of musical theater well known throughout the nation. The Djiboutian attire is typical of other countries in the Horn of Africa.

Media
Djibouti has long been a center of media in the country. The first forms of public film display in the city and Djibouti at large were newsreels of key events during the early colonial period. The Djibouti-based Radio Television of Djibouti is the principal national public service broadcaster. RTD airs 24 hours a day, and can be viewed both within Djibouti and abroad via terrestrial and satellite platforms. Several newspapers, magazines and printing facilities have their offices in the capital. Additionally, Djibouti is a center for broadcast media, with a number of radio and television stations airing from the city. Various film and music productions are also filmed in the city.

Cuisine

Djibouti has long been renowned for its diverse cuisine. Traditional Somali, Afar and Yemeni delicacies are served alongside international dishes; especially French culinary staples. The Yemeni dish mandi is also a very popular meal particularly during lunchtime. Several other popular dishes feature seafood and meat, including Fah-fah (spicy boiled beef soup).

Additionally, there are a number of restaurants located throughout the city. These establishments serve everything from traditional dishes, to gourmet delicacies, to fast food and snacks. Among the more popular eateries in the capital city are the Café de la Gare, the Zip Zap Restaurant and Shisha Lounge. There are also fast food restaurants, such as Pointburger and Burger City.

Festivals
Annual events and celebrations in Djibouti include Independence Day, which is celebrated on 27 June. The Muslim festivals of Eid al-Fitr and Eid al-Adha also feature prominently in the city's cultural observances, events and celebrations. Additional local, national and international events are held here throughout the year.

Sports
Football is the most popular sport in Djibouti, and Djibouti city has a number of sporting teams that compete in national and regional leagues. Basketball is also a second popular sport in the city. The city is home to El Hadj Hassan Gouled Aptidon Stadium, which plays host to the Djibouti Cup and to football teams from the Djibouti Premier League. Djibouti has established a high-profile reputation as a host city for international sporting events. At the beginning of the 20th century, a number of sporting institutions were established in the city, particularly in schools and colleges.

Main sights

Places of worship
Among places of worship in the city, mosques predominate.

The Hamoudi Mosque is one of the oldest Islamic places of worship in the capital. It was built circa 1897 AD. It is the city's main mosque, and an iconic building in Djiboutian society.

The Mosque of Al Sada was constructed in 1912, with a capacity of up to 1,500 worshippers.

The Cathedral of Djibouti was built in 1964 beside the Boulevard of the Republic by the colonial authorities in French Somaliland on the site where another church, Sainte-Jeanne-d'Arc, had been demolished because of its narrowness.

Shopping
Foreign visitors to Djibouti frequent the shops on Bender Road (Rue de Bender), where traditional fabrics, goods and leather products can be found at bargain prices. The Casino Supermarket (Casino Supermarché) is the capital's largest shopping center. The open Ryad Market (Marché de Ryad)  is the main commercial outlet for fresh produce, meat, clothing, and other goods and services.

Palaces

The presidential palace is the official residence and principal workplace of the President of Djibouti. It overlooks the Gulf of Tadjoura, with access to both the harbour and airport.

Institutes
The Regional Somali Language Academy is an intergovernmental regulating body for the Somali language in the Horn region. On 28 June 2013, the Government of Djibouti, the Federal Government of Somalia and the Government of Ethiopia launched the Regional Somali Language Academy at a ceremony in Djibouti City. The event was organized by Djibouti's Ministry of Islamic Affairs, Culture and Waqf in conjunction with the Somali-Speaking PEN Centre of Djibouti, and was attended by around 50 prominent Somali-speaking intellectuals from the region and elsewhere. Among the guests were Somalia's Minister of Information, Posts and Telecommunications Abdullahi Elmoge Hersi, Somaliland’s Minister of Culture Abiib Diriye Nur, and the Vice President of the Somali Region of Ethiopia Abdihakim Igal Omar.

Parks
Djibouti has several public parks. The largest of these is the Lagarde Park.

Nature Reserve
The DECAN Refuge, about 10 km southeast of Djibouti, is an association that takes in endangered animals, often victims of poaching. It is designed as a means of protection of cheetahs, lions, caracals, ostrichs, and other wild animals, many of them victims of poaching. There are plans to extend it from 30 acres to 600 acres, down to the coastline, which would encompass a mangrove area. DECAN also runs education programs for school children.

Economy
As the capital and largest city in Djibouti, most local businesses have their headquarters in the city. Djibouti Telecom, the largest telecommunications company in the country, is based here. During its existence, Djibouti Airlines also had its head office in the city. Djibouti is the financial hub to many entrepreneurial industries ranging from construction, retail, import and export, money transfer companies, and Internet cafés.

Cargo operations at the Port of Djibouti are the chief economic activity of Djibouti. The city's port is the terminus for Ethiopian oil transport and export. Increase in railway infrastructure has further enabled Ethiopian and Eritrean oil products to reach the capital.

Banking
The banking sector is one of the principal foundations of Djibouti's economy. The financial sector of the Republic of Djibouti has grown dramatically in recent years, a process that began in the early 2000s, and that was in large part prompted by an explosion the number of exchange agencies and remittances throughout the country. The Djiboutian financial sector, with total assets of 265 billion DJF or 10.2 per cent of GDP, has not been affected by the international financial crisis. Djibouti has been considered an oasis of peace and a model of political stability in a region.

Business
Djibouti is introducing itself as a business hub. The city's skyline is being continuously transformed through the emergence of new projects. The business sector is largely concentrated in the service sector. Commercial activities revolve around the country's free trade policies and strategic location as a Red Sea transit point.

Tourism

Tourism in Djibouti is centered in the Djibouti region. City landmarks include historic buildings, two important public squares, and the Hall of the People. Many private companies offer organized tours of these sites. Known as the "Pearl of the Gulf of Aden", the city's sandy beaches are also popular tourist attractions.

A popular local attraction, this beach has a number of restaurant establishments overlooking the sea. With its main restaurant, Doraleh is a favorite hangout on Fridays leading up to the weekend. Other prominent beaches in the city include Siesta Beach and Heron Beach.

The two small Maskali and Moucha islands are situated an hour's boat ride from Djibouti. They feature madreporic mangroves, with a rich seabed and colorful algae. Various fish species can also be found in the local coral gardens, including groupers, jacks and barracuda.

Another notable city landmark is La Place du 27 Juin, a street named after Djibouti's independence day. The Place Mahamoud-Harbi (formerly Place Rimbaud) was similarly named in honor of a prominent local figure, erstwhile Vice President of the Government Council Mahmoud Harbi.

Hotels
Djibouti has over 40 hotels. Most are situated within the capital area or along the Djibouti Palace Kempinski's beachfront. Among the more prominent hotel establishments and guest houses are the Apart Hotel Moulk Center, the Hotel La Siesta, the Sheraton Djibouti Hotel located on the waterfront, the Kempinsky Hotel, the Hotel Bellevue, the Hotel Casino Impérial, and the Hotel Acacias on Avenue F. d'Esperey.

Transport

Road
Djibouti is a major transportation hub, served by a comprehensive public transport network. Roads leading out of the city connect it to other national localities and to Somalia and Ethiopia. Public transportation is provided through buses stationed at the Djibouti Bus Service Enterprise. The city at large serves as a point of intersection for the main roads and highways linking different parts of the country. It is one of the most accessible urban areas in the country, where one can find public and private transportation 24 hours a day and 7 days a week. A significant number of the city's residents use the local informal minibuses and taxis, which include a fleet of 400 green-and-white taxis. The main bus hub in Djibouti is the Central Bus Station, located at the crossing of Rue de Bender.

Air

Djibouti is served primarily by the Djibouti-Ambouli International Airport. It is the second largest airport in the Horn of Africa, and offers flights to numerous global destinations. , the largest services using the airport include Air Djibouti, Yemenia, Air France, Flydubai, Ethiopian Airlines, Turkish Airlines, Kenya Airways and Qatar Airways. It is the largest airport in Djibouti and serves as a major gateway for travellers to the Horn of Africa and the world. Originally a modest-sized facility, the airport grew considerably in size in the post-independence period after numerous successive renovation projects. Outbound international travel from the Djibouti-Ambouli International Airport accounts for the majority of all air passengers traveling to and from Djibouti. Due to its strategic location, the facility acts as a civil aviation hub for the rest of the country. This makes for a large number of departures and arrivals, and it is not unusual for flights to be delayed in the holding pattern before landing.

Sea

The Port of Djibouti is one of the largest and busiest seaports in the Horn region. , the container terminal at the port handles the bulk of the nation's trade. About 70% of the seaport's activity consists of imports to and exports from neighboring Ethiopia, which depends on the harbour as its main maritime outlet. The port also serves as an international refueling center and transshipment hub. In 2012, the Djiboutian government in collaboration with DP World started construction on the Doraleh Container Terminal, a third major seaport intended to further develop the national transit capacity. A$396 million project, it has the capacity to accommodate 1.5 million  container units annually.

Railway

Djibouti is a terminus of the Addis Ababa–Djibouti Railway. For most of its length, the railway runs parallel to the abandoned metre-gauge Ethio-Djibouti Railway. However, the standard-gauge railway is built on a new, straighter right-of-way that allows for much higher speeds. New stations have been built outside city centres, and the old stations have been decommissioned. On 10 January 2017, the 100 km section of Djibouti side was inaugurated in a ceremony held in the new station by Djibouti's President Ismail Omar Guelleh and Ethiopia's prime minister Hailemariam Dessalegn. There are two local railway stations: a passenger station at Nagad, and a freight station at the Port of Doraleh.

Education

Djibouti is the largest and most important educational center in the nation. It is home to many elementary and high schools, religious schools, and other institutions of learning. Public primary and secondary schools in the capital are run by the Ministry of Education. The Djiboutian public education is mainly French-speaking, with a parallel Arabic-speaking sector. It culminated in the French baccalaureate issued by the Bordeaux Academy until 2014. Since 2015, it has been a Djiboutian national diploma.

Tertiary institutions in Djibouti include:
 University of Djibouti – largest and oldest university in Djibouti. Established in 1977, it has approximately 15,000 students.
 Institut Supérieur des Sciences et de la Santé

Twin towns – sister cities
Djibouti is twinned with the following places:

Notable residents

References

Works cited

External links

 

Regions of Djibouti
Populated places in Djibouti
Populated coastal places in Djibouti
Capitals in Africa
City-states
Port cities in Africa
Ports and harbours of the Indian Ocean
Populated places established in 1888
1888 establishments in Africa